Sarangapur is a village Sarangapur mandal in Jagtial district of the Indian state of Telangana. Before reorganisation of districts in Telanaga in 2016, Sarangapur mandal was a part of Karimnagar district.

References 

Villages in Jagtial district